Nothridae is a family of oribatids in the order Oribatida. There are at least 3 genera and 70 described species in Nothridae.

Genera
 Nothrus Koch, 1836
 Novonothrus Hammer, 1966
 Trichonothrus Mahunka, 1986

References

Further reading

 
 
 
 

Acariformes
Acari families